The following are the national records in track cycling in Kazakhstan maintained by Kazakhstan Cycling Federation.

Men

Women

References

External links
 SFRK website

Kazakhstan
Records
Track cycling
track cycling